Spinosipella is a genus of small carnivorous bivalves in the family Verticordiidae.

Species 

 Spinosipella acuticostata (Philippi, 1844)
 Spinosipella agnes Simone & C. Cunha, 2008
 Spinosipella costeminens (Poutiers, 1981)
 Spinosipella deshayesiana (P. Fischer, 1862)
 Spinosipella tinga Simone & C. Cunha, 2008
 Spinosipella xui J.-X. Jiang, Y.-Q. Huang, Q.-Y. Liang & J.-L. Zhang, 2019

References 

Verticordiidae
Bivalve genera